Eagleton may refer to:

People
 Eagleton (surname)

Places
 Eagleton, Wisconsin, United States
 Eagleton Village, Tennessee, United States
 Eagleton, a hamlet adjoining (or within) Pabail Iarach in Point, Outer Hebrides, Scotland
Eagleton, fictional town in Indiana, from the show Parks and Recreation

Other
 Eagleton Institute of Politics at Rutgers University in New Brunswick, New Jersey
"Eagleton" (Parks and Recreation), an episode of the comedy series Parks and Recreation